Jefferson Apartment Building is a historic apartment building located at Niagara Falls in Niagara County, New York. It is an eight-story brick structure constructed in 1926 and is the city's sole example of a high rise, full service early 20th century apartment building designed for middle and upper income residents. Currently The Jefferson is still standing, fully renovated, and the premiere location for downtown living. You can visit the official website for leasing information.

It was listed on the National Register of Historic Places in 2005.

References

External links
Official Web Page for Apartments & Leasing
Jefferson Apartment Building - U.S. National Register of Historic Places on Waymarking.com

Residential buildings on the National Register of Historic Places in New York (state)
Colonial Revival architecture in New York (state)
Gothic Revival architecture in New York (state)
Residential buildings completed in 1926
Buildings and structures in Niagara Falls, New York
National Register of Historic Places in Niagara County, New York
Apartment buildings on the National Register of Historic Places
Apartment buildings in New York (state)